Bruce is a hamlet in Alberta, Canada within Beaver County.

The community has the middle name of A. Bruce Smith, a telephone executive.

The hamlet is located in Census Division No. 10 and in the federal riding of Vegreville-Wainwright.

The Bruce Hotel is known to have the best steak in Alberta, and only operates on Friday and Saturday evenings.

Demographics 

Notable residents 
Samantha King – Canadian country/blues singer

See also 
List of communities in Alberta
List of hamlets in Alberta

References

External links 

Beaver County, Alberta
Designated places in Alberta
Hamlets in Alberta